Electric Loco Shed, Tatanagar is a motive power depot performing locomotive maintenance and repair facility for electric locomotives of the Indian Railways, located at Tatanagar of the South Eastern Railway zone in Jharkhand, India.

Operations
Being one of the three electric engine sheds in South Eastern Railway, various major and minor maintenance schedules of electric locomotives are carried out here. It has the sanctioned capacity of 120 engine units. Beyond the operating capacity, this shed houses a total of 200 engine units, including 27 WAP-7 and 174 WAG-9. Like all locomotive sheds, TATA does regular maintenance, overhaul and repair including painting and washing of locomotives.

Livery & Markings
TATA based WAP-7 has TATA Steel advertisement on loco's body side.

Tatanagar loco shed has its own logo and stencils. It is written on loco's body side as well as front & back side.

Locomotives

References

Tatanagar
Jamshedpur
1962 establishments in Bihar
Rail transport in Jharkhand